Michael Sean "Fitz" Fitzpatrick (born 21 July 1970) is a French-born American musician and singer-songwriter, who is the lead vocalist of the indie pop/neo-soul band Fitz and the Tantrums.

Fitz and the Tantrums were heralded as a "band to watch" in an April 2011 profile in Rolling Stone. Their 2010 debut full-length album Pickin' Up the Pieces received critical acclaim and reached #1 on the Billboard Heatseekers chart.

In May 2021, Fitzpatrick released his debut solo album Head Up High.

Biography 
Born in Montluçon, France, Fitzpatrick grew up in Los Angeles. His father, Robert Fitzpatrick, is Irish American and his mother, Sylvie, is French. He attended the L.A. County High School for the Arts, studying vocal music and then studied experimental film at the California Institute of the Arts, where he met fellow band member James King. Although he now composes primarily on the piano and organ, he only had formal piano training later in life. He has said, "I'd always been a decent singer, but I got frustrated by my inability to play piano by anything more than by ear. I took piano lessons when I was 32, and it opened up a whole new vocabulary for me." Fitzpatrick grew up mostly listening to classical music, as he was discouraged from listening to other music styles in the household. One concession, however, was being allowed to listen to a local oldie radio station in the car driving to and from school.

After college he worked for many years behind the scenes as a sound engineer for producer Mickey Petralia, who produced Beck, Ladytron, Flight of the Conchords, and The Dandy Warhols.

In late 2008, Fitzpatrick received a call from an ex-girlfriend to tell him about a neighbor who needed to unload or sell a church organ for $50. Fitzpatrick told her to pay the neighbor the $50 and arranged to have the organ moved to his apartment that same day. That evening, inspired by the organ, he wrote the song "Breakin' the Chains of Love". He has stated, "I immediately knew it was the best song I'd written. I could astral plane out and hear myself, like, 'wow!' Not bad!". Fitzpatrick decided to form a band, and contacted friend and saxophonist James King. Through phone calls they assembled the band, with King recommending singer Noelle Scaggs and drummer John Wicks, and Wicks in turn bringing in bassist Ethan Phillips and keyboardist Jeremy Ruzumna. The band met for its first rehearsal a week later and instantly clicked.

In interviews he has emphasized his eclectic musical tastes. He has said, "We [the band] all have a love affair with soul and funk music. For me, it’s obviously Otis Redding, Marvin Gaye, the Supremes, all that stuff. My musical taste runs the gamut from Radiohead to Zeppelin to Major Lazer. My older brother was really into '80s new wave, so a lot of the first records I got to borrow and steal were his."

Personal life 
In May 2013, it was announced that Fitzpatrick was expecting a child with then-girlfriend actress Kaylee DeFer. DeFer gave birth to their son in September 2013. Fitzpatrick and DeFer married on 25 July 2015. They welcomed their second son in April 2017 and a third son was born on 26 May 2019.

Discography

Albums

Solo 
 Head Up High

With Band of Merrymakers 
 Welcome to Our Christmas Party

With Fitz and the Tantrums 
 Pickin' Up the Pieces
 More Than Just a Dream
 Fitz and the Tantrums
 All the Feels

Singles

As solo artist

As featured artist

Guest appearances

References

External links 
 

1970 births
Living people
American male singers
California Institute of the Arts alumni
Fitz and The Tantrums members
Los Angeles County High School for the Arts alumni
Singers from Los Angeles
People from Montluçon
French emigrants to the United States
French people of Irish descent
21st-century American singers